Agamodon is a small genus of worm lizards in the family Trogonophidae. They are found in the Horn of Africa and in the southern part of the Arabian peninsula. The genus contains the following three species:
Angled worm lizard Agamodon anguliceps Peters, 1882
Arabian worm lizard Agamodon arabicus Anderson, 1901
Flat worm lizard Agamodon compressus Mocquard, 1888

References

 
Lizard genera
Reptiles of Africa
Reptiles of the Arabian Peninsula
Taxa named by Wilhelm Peters